George Bovet (27 November 1874, Neuchâtel, Switzerland – 20 May 1946) was a Swiss Politician from the Free Democratic Party of Switzerland (FDP).

Son of former Chancellor of the canton of Neuchâtel, Henri Alphonse, he studied at Geneva before pursuing linguistic studies at the University of Berlin, then law at the University of Bern where he obtained his doctorate.

He began his career as a journalist at National Suisse of La Chaux-de-Fonds (1896-1898), then was the Bern political correspondent of the Revue of Lausanne, Le Temps of Paris, and the Frankfurter Zeitung (1898-1927).

From 1910, he was also employed at the Federal Chancellery as translator then as secretary of the National Council from 1911, then finally as Vice-Chancellor from 1927. After the resignation of Robert Käslin, Bovet was elected Chancellor of Switzerland in 1935 following a difficult election facing SP candidate Oskar Leimgruber, who would eventually become Chancellor after Bovet.

He served as Chancellor until 1943 and during this period waives the second Francophone Vice Chancellor, assuming editorials himself in French. Bovet was the second French-speaking Chancellor. He resigned in 1943 and died three years later.

References

Federal Chancellors of Switzerland
1874 births
1946 deaths
1940s in Switzerland
20th-century Swiss politicians